is a Japanese actor and model who was affiliated with Evergreen Entertainment. He left the agency on March 2019 after 8 years and now is a freelancer. He is best known for his role as the character, Chase/Mashin Chaser/Kamen Rider Chaser, from the Kamen Rider series Kamen Rider Drive.

Early life
Katono was born in Sendai, Miyagi Prefecture, Japan. While in high school Katono entered the 23rd Junon Super Boy Contest. At the final selection meeting, he was awarded the Grand Prix from among the 5,132 applicants.

Career 
In March 2011, Katono's debut in the compilation album Tokyo Ragga Lovers2 as a jacket model. In the same year in May, his acting debut in raising army performance came alongside the Junon Super Boy Contest. He appeared in television dramas, films, and stage plays. In 2012, Katono was selected in the magazine The Television Zoom!! Vol. 7 The Year the Expectation of the U-22 Actor as number one.

In 2014, he starred in the Japan tour of New York City's transvestite ballet Grand Diva. He had no experience of ballet and received training in New York for the role.

Filmography

TV series

Films

References

External links
 Taiko Katono's official website

1992 births
Living people
21st-century Japanese male actors
Japanese male models
People from Sendai
Models from Miyagi Prefecture
Kamen Rider
Actors from Miyagi Prefecture